Matthew Tayler-Smith (born 22 April 1987) is a South African rugby union player.

He played for Maties in the Varsity Cup.

References

South African rugby union players
Eastern Province Elephants players
South African people of British descent
Living people
1987 births
Rugby union fly-halves
Rugby union players from Port Elizabeth